The 1983–84 Ohio Bobcats men's basketball team represented Ohio University as a member of the Mid-American Conference in the college basketball season of 1983–84. The team was coached by Danny Nee in his third season at Ohio. They played their home games at Convocation Center. The Bobcats finished with a record of 20–8 and second in the MAC regular season with a conference record of 14–4.

Schedule

|-
!colspan=9 style=| Regular Season

|-
!colspan=12 style=| MAC regular season

|-
!colspan=9 style=| MAC Tournament

Source:

Statistics

Team Statistics
Final 1983–84 Statistics

Source

Player statistics

Source

References

Ohio Bobcats men's basketball seasons
Ohio
Ohio Bobcats men's basketball
Ohio Bobcats men's basketball